Tuşnad Cycling Team is a Romanian UCI Continental cycling team established in 2009.

Team roster

Major wins

2009
Stage 4 Tour of Szeklerland, Aurélien Passeron
2010
Stage 7 Tour of Romania, Andrea Pinos
2011
 National Time Trial championships, Sergiu Cioban
2012
Overall Romanian Cycling Tour, Matija Kvasina
Stage 5, Matija Kvasina
 National Time Trial championships, Sergiu Cioban
Central European Tour Miskolc GP, Krisztián Lovassy
Stages 3 & 4a (ITT), Matija Kvasina
2013
Overall Tour de Serbie, Ivan Stević
 National Time Trial championships, Nicolae Tanovițchii
 National Road Race championships, Ivan Stević
 National U23 Time Trial championships, Sergiu Cioban
2014
Banja Luka-Belgrade II, Ivan Stević
Stage 3b Tour of Szeklerland, Sebastien Anaya
2015
 U23 Time Trial championships, Andrei Barbu
2017
Prologue Tour of Szeklerland, Nicolae Tanovițchii
Stage 1 Tour de Serbia, Hugo Ángel Velázquez

National champions
2011
 Moldova National Time Trial, Sergiu Cioban
2012
 Moldova National Time Trial, Sergiu Cioban
2013
 Moldova National Time Trial, Nicolae Tanovițchii
 National Road Race, Ivan Stević
 Moldova National U23 Time Trial, Sergiu Cioban
2015
 Romania U23 Time Trial, Andrei Barbu

References

UCI Continental Teams (Europe)
Cycling teams established in 2009
Cycling teams based in Romania